Paul Marquis (born 29 August 1972) is an English former football defender.

Marquis came through the schoolboy sides of Cheshunt and made 15 appearances for their first team as an eighteen-year-old before moving to the youth squad for West Ham United. Graduating through the reserve team, Marquis played only 60 seconds of first-team football for West Ham, coming on in the 90th minute for Mike Marsh, in February 1994, in a 0–0 draw with Manchester City. In March 1994 Marquis was given a free transfer by West Ham and was signed by Doncaster Rovers.

References

External links

Since 1888... The Searchable Premiership and Football League Player Database (subscription required)

1972 births
Association football defenders
Living people
Footballers from Enfield, London
English footballers
Cheshunt F.C. players
West Ham United F.C. players
Doncaster Rovers F.C. players
Gateshead F.C. players
St Albans City F.C. players
Bradford (Park Avenue) A.F.C. players
Premier League players
English Football League players